Hirschbach is a town in the district of Gmünd in Lower Austria, Austria.

Geography
Hirschbach lies on the Moosbach in the upper Waldviertel, about 15 km east of Gmünd. About 55.66 percent of the municipality is forested.

References

External links
Municipal website
Topothek Hirschbach (collection of historical documents and photographs)

Cities and towns in Gmünd District